The 2017 Argyll and Bute Council elections took place on 4 May 2017 alongside local elections across Scotland. This was the third local election to take place using the Single Transferable Vote electoral system.

Background
At the previous election in 2012, Independent councillors were the largest grouping on the council, with a total of 15 councillors, while the Scottish National Party (SNP) had 13 councillors. Following that election, an administration was formed between the SNP and the Argyll First group of independent councillors. However, this coalition broke down in 2013, after the SNP National Executive prevented the SNP group forming a coalition with the Scottish Conservatives and the Scottish Liberal Democrats. Four members of the SNP group (former SNP group leader Roddy McCuish, Mary Jean Devon, Michael Breslin and Robert MacIntyre) left the SNP in 2013, following the collapse of the SNP-independent administration, and sat as independents for the remainder of their terms as councillors. A coalition of Independents, Scottish Conservatives, and Liberal Democrats was formed in October 2013, led by an independent councillor, Dick Walsh. The collapse of the SNP-independent administration led to an investigation by Audit Scotland.

A number of councillors who had been elected in 2012 did not serve a full term and resigned prior to the 2017 elections:

 SNP councillor Fred Hall left the SNP group in 2013 and sat as an independent. He resigned in 2014, which led to a by-election in the Oban South and the Isles ward in May 2014, which was won by Neil MacIntyre for Scottish Labour.
 Louise Lee, who had been elected for the SNP for Oban North and Lorn in 2012, also resigned in 2014, resulting in a by-election in July 2014, which was won by the independent candidate John McGregor, who died shortly afterwards. The death of John MacGregor led to another by-election in Oban North and Lorn, which was won by Iain MacLean for the SNP in October 2014. Iain MacLean left the SNP in March 2016 and sat for the remainder of his term as an independent.
 John Semple, SNP councillor for South Kintyre, also resigned after the Scottish Independence referendum, leading to a by-election in December 2014, which was won by John Armour for the SNP.
 Duncan MacIntyre (Independent, Oban North and Lorn) resigned for health reasons in December 2015. His seat was won by Julie MacKenzie for the SNP in February 2016.
 Iain Angus MacDonald, who had originally been elected as an Independent councillor for Oban North and Lorn in 2012, joined the SNP in September 2014, but resigned in March 2016. The resulting by-election in June 2016 was won by an independent, Kieron Green.

Eight of the sitting councillors did not seek re-election, including the outgoing council leader Dick Walsh (Independent), Michael Breslin (Independent, originally SNP), Iain MacLean (Independent, originally SNP)), Vivien Dance (Independent), Bruce Marshall (Independent), Isobel Strong (SNP), Neil MacIntyre (Scottish Labour), and Maurice Corry (Scottish Conservative).

Results

The SNP became the largest party on the council for the first time, as the Independent group lost a third of its seats compared to the previous election. The Conservatives gained five seats and the Liberal Democrats gained two, but both remained in their respective places as the two smaller parties.

Despite the SNP's position, a coalition was formed of Conservatives, Liberal Democrats and Independents, referred to as The Argyll Lomond and the Isles Group (TALIG). Aileen Morton, leader of the group, was elected as council leader.

Ward results

South Kintyre

There was no election for the ward of South Kintyre, a three-member ward, as there were only three candidates nominated: Donald Kelly (Scottish Conservative), John Armour (SNP), and Rory Colville (Liberal Democrat), all of whom were the incumbent councillors for the ward.

Kintyre and the Islands
(Includes Colonsay, Gigha, Islay, Jura, Scarba)
2012: 1xSNP; 1xIndependent; 1xLib Dem
2017: 1xSNP; 1xLib Dem; 1xConservative
2012–2017 Change: Conservative gain one seat from Independent

Mid Argyll
2012: 2xIndependent; 1xSNP
2017: 2xIndependent; 1xSNP
2012–2017 Change: No change

Oban South and the Isles
(Includes Coll, Iona, Mull, Tiree)
2012: 3xSNP; 1xIndependent
2017: 2xIndependent; 1xSNP; 1xCon
2012–2017 Change: Conservative and Independent gain one seat each from SNP

Oban North and Lorn
2012: 3xIndependent; 1xSNP
2017: 2xIndependent; 1xSNP; 1xCon
2012–2017 Change: Conservative gain from Independent

Cowal
2012: 2xIndependent; 1xSNP
2017: 1xSNP; 1xConservative; 1xLiberal Democrat
2012–2017 Change: Conservative & Liberal Democrat each gain one seat from Independent

Dunoon
2012: 2xIndependent; 1xSNP
2017: 1xSNP; 1xCon; 1xIndependent
2012–2017 Change: Con gain one seat from Independent

Isle of Bute
2012: 2xSNP; 1xIndependent
2017: 2xIndependent; 1xSNP
2012–2017 Change: Independent gain one seat from SNP

Lomond North
2012: 2xIndependent; 1xCon
2017: 1xCon; 1xSNP; 1xIndependent;
2012–2017 Change: SNP gain from Independent

Helensburgh Central
2012: 1xIndependent; 1xSNP; 1xCon; 1xLib Dem
2017: 1xCon; 1xSNP; 2xLib Dem
2012–2017 Change: Lib Dem gain from Independent

Helensburgh and Lomond South
2012: 1xLib Dem; 1xSNP; 1xCon
2017: 1xLib Dem; 1xSNP; 1xCon
2012–2017 Change: No Change

Changes since 2017
† Helensburgh and Lomond South Liberal Democrat Cllr Ellen Morton died on 10 May 2020.  The by-election occurred on 18 March 2021, being won by the Conservative candidate.
†† Isle of Bute Independent Cllr Len Scoullar died on 15 November 2020 following a battle with illness. The by-election took place on 18 March 2021 and was won by an Independent.
††† Lomond North Conservative Cllr Barbara Morgan announced her resignation from the Council in October 2021. The by-election was held on 16 December 2021.

By-Elections since 2017

References

2017 Scottish local elections
Argyll and Bute Council elections